Peter Voets (born 17 September 1968) is a Belgian football defender and later manager.

References

1968 births
Living people
Belgian footballers
Sint-Truidense V.V. players
Belgian Pro League players
Association football defenders
Belgian football managers
Sint-Truidense V.V. managers
People from Sint-Truiden
Footballers from Limburg (Belgium)